Titus II Mar Thoma Metropolitan (Mar Thoma XVI) (6 May 1866 – 6 July 1944) was the head of the Malankara Mar Thoma Syrian Church with its center in Kerala state in south-western India. He was known as Thithoos Dwitheeyan Mar Thoma Metropolitan among his people. (Thithoos is Aramaic and Malayalam)

It was in the Malabar Coast in the 1st century CE, Thomas the Apostle arrived to preach the gospel to the Jews and non-Jewish locals, from whom emerged the Nasrani people and their Malankara Church.  They followed a unique Hebrew-Syriac Christian tradition which included several Jewish elements and Indian customs. The Mar Thoma Syrian Church is still a part of this Malankara Church community.

Early days

Palakunnathu Family 
In the 17th century, a member of the Panamkuzhy family (a branch of the Pakalomattam family), came and settled in Kozhencherry on the banks of river Pampa. Later they moved to Maramon, and lived at Chackkalyil, on the other side of the river. The second son in that family, Mathen moved to a nearby house at Palakunnathu. He had six sons and a daughter. The daughter was married to Mallapally Pavoothikunnel family and the first four sons moved to Themoottil, Neduvelil (Kozhenchery), Periyilel and Punamadom (Othera). The fifth son was a hermit priest (sanyasi achen). As was the custom, the youngest son Mathew lived at Palakunnathu family house. (This house still exists). Abraham Malpan, leader of reformation in Malankara church was the second son of Mathew.  Thomas Mar Athanasius Metropolitan and Titus I Mar Thoma Metropolitan (Marthoma Metropolitan I) were the sons of Abraham Malpan.

A number of other Marthoma Church leaders were also born in this family. Mathews Mar Athanasius Metropolitan and Titus I Mar Thoma Metropolitan (Marthoma Metropolitan I) were from this family. The present head of the Marthoma Church, Dr. Joseph Mar Thoma Metropolitan (Marthoma Metropolitan VII), is also from this family.

Early age 
P.J. Dethos (Aramaic. Titus – English) was born on 6 May 1866 as the youngest son of Maramon Palakunnathu Joseph (brother of Mathews Mar Athanasius Metropolitan) and Mavelikara Vadakkethalackal Mariamma.

After primary education at Maramon he joined Kottayam seminary. He was at C.M.S. High school, Kottayam and at St. Joseph's school, Trivandrum, before returning home to study Syriac.

Ordination
He was ordained by Thomas Mar Athanasius Metropolitan in 1889 and was appointed as assistant vicar in his home parish at Maramon church.

He was elected as a member of the Managing Committee (now known as Sabha Council) and a Representative Assembly (now known as Prathinidhi Mandalam) of the church. During this period he took active participation in the consecration of Titus I Mar Thoma.

Consecration

Malankara throne

After the great swearing – Coonen Cross Oath in 1653, it became necessary to appoint a bishop. For this purpose, a special chair was made and Mar Thoma I the first bishop of Malankara church was enthroned. This throne, used for the consecration of Mar Thoma I, is in the possession of the Mar Thoma Church and is kept at Tiruvalla, It has been used in the installation of every Mar Thoma Metropolitan, to this day, so that the continuity of the throne of Mar Thoma is ensured. This was the throne used for the consecration of Mar Thoma XVI, Titus II Mar Thoma Metropolitan.

In 1896, the Representative Assembly of the church decided to consecrate Rev. P.J. Dethos as the successor of Titus I Mar Thoma. On 9 December 1896, Rev. P.J. Dethos was consecrated by Titus I Mar Thoma with the assistance of Geevarghese Mar Koorilose V (Karumamkuzhi Pulikkottil) Metropolitan of the Malabar Independent Syrian Church with the Episcopal title Thithoos Dwitheeyan Mar Thoma Metropolitan (Titus II Mar Thoma). It was held in Puthencavu palli, one of the biggest churches in Kerala at that time.

As suffragan Metropolitan
He was given proper training and guidance by Titus I Mar Thoma. It was a period when the church was growing. This continued until the end of his life in 1944. For eleven years he was suffragan Metropolitan and was able to consecrate 33 new parishes.

Enthronement
Titus I Mar Thoma, died on 20 October 1909. The enthronement of Titus II Mar Thoma took place on 20 October 1909 at Kozhencherry Mar Thoma church.

Administration

Church
A number of important decisions were taken during this time.  
The faction of the Malankara church that was known as Bava Kakshi decided to have the name Malankara Mar Thoma Syrian Church.(Synonym: Mar Thoma Church.Eponym of St. Thomas disciple of Jesus Christ)
Poolatheen, residence of the Metropolitan was built at Tiruvalla on 1919.
After losing the Seminary case in 1889, the church lost possession of most of the churches. So most of the parishioners had their worship services in temporary sheds. During the time of Titus II permanent buildings were constructed for the parishes.

Parishes
Many of the parishes of the Mar Thoma Church were established by the laity. After forming a congregation, they inform the Metropolitan for approval as a parish and to send a priest. The first such parish formed outside India was the Klang parish in Malaysia in 1936.

Finance
In 1937, Mar Thoma Church made an unusual decision, that all activities of the Church should be carried out by voluntary contributions from its members. Though there was some skepticism in the beginning, it was a great leap forward for the church.

Organizations
A number of organizations were started during his tenure.  Mar Thoma Evangelistic Association (1888), Maramon Convention (1895), Mar Thoma Sunday School Samjam (1905), Mar Thoma Suvisesha Sevika Sanghom (1919), Mar Thoma Voluntary Evangelists' Association (1924), Mar Thoma Yuvajana Sakhyam (1933).

Schools & colleges
Some of the schools that were opened during his time:
S.C. Seminary School, Tiruvalla (1902), Kozhencherry School (1904), Maramon School (1918, Kottayam Theological College (1923) Tiruvalla S.C. Training School (1925).

Union Christian College Aluva, one of the prominent educational institutions in Kerala state in South India was founded in 1921 as a joint effort of four churches in Kerala: Malankara Jacobite Syrian Church, Malankara Orthodox Syrian Church, Church of South India and Malankara Mar Thoma Syrian Church.

Successors
Even before Marett Rev. M. N. Abraham was ordained as a deacon in 1911, the church leaders unanimously decided to select him as a bishop of the Mar Thoma Church. He was consecrated as an episcopa on 27 December 1917 at Tiruvalla and was given the episcopal title, Abraham Mar Thoma Suffragan Metropolitan.

Because the number of parishes increased, the Representative Assembly (Mandalam) decided to have two more bishops. They selected Ayroor Cherukara Rev. C. M. John and Ayroor Kurudamannil Rev. C. T. Mathew. They were consecrated as episcopal on 30 December 1937 at Tiruvalla. Rev. C. M. John was given the title Juhanon Mar Timotheos and Rev. C. T. Mathew was given the title Mathews Mar Athanasius.

Last days
Titus II Metropolitan was a diabetic for a long time. By 1941 he lost his eyesight also. At this time, he was helped by the other Metropolitans. On Thursday 6 July 1944, Titus II Metropolitan died. He was interred in the Bishops' cemetery in the SCS Compound, Tiruvalla.

See also
 Mar Thoma Church
 Throne of St. Thomas
 Marthoma Metrans
 List of Malankara Metropolitans
 Syrian Malabar Nasrani
 Saint Thomas Christians
 Christianity in India
 List of Catholicoi of the East and Malankara Metropolitans
 List of Syrian Malabar Nasranis
 Titus I Mar Thoma
 Abraham Mar Thoma

References

Further reading
Juhanon Marthoma Metropolitan, The Most Rev. Dr. (1952). Christianity in India and a Brief History of the Marthoma Syrian Church. Pub: K.M. Cherian.
Zac Varghese Dr. & Mathew A. Kallumpram. (2003). Glimpses of Mar Thoma Church History. London, England. .
Chacko, T. C. (1936) Malankara Marthoma Sabha Charithra Samgraham (Concise History of Marthoma Church), Pub: E.J. Institute, Kompady, Tiruvalla.
Eapen, Prof. Dr. K. V. (2001). Malankara Marthoma Suryani Sabha Charitram (History of Malankara Marthoma Syrian Church). Pub: Kallettu, Muttambalam, Kottayam.
Mathew, N. M. Malankara Marthoma Sabha Charitram (History of the Marthoma Church), Volume 1 (2006), Volume II (2007), Volume III (2008). Pub. E.J.Institute, Thiruvalla.

External links 
 http://marthomasyrianchurch.org

1866 births
1944 deaths
People from Pathanamthitta district
Saint Thomas Christians
Titus II
Pakalomattam family